An arterial blood gas (ABG) test, or arterial blood gas analysis (ABGA) measures the amounts of arterial gases, such as oxygen and carbon dioxide. An ABG test requires that a small volume of blood be drawn from the radial artery with a syringe and a thin needle, but sometimes the femoral artery in the groin or another site is used. The blood can also be drawn from an arterial catheter.

An ABG test measures the blood gas tension values of the arterial partial pressure of oxygen (PaO2), and the arterial partial pressure of carbon dioxide (PaCO2), and the blood's pH. In addition, the arterial oxygen saturation (SaO2) can be determined. Such information is vital when caring for patients with critical illnesses or respiratory disease. Therefore, the ABG test is one of the most common tests performed on patients in intensive-care units. In other levels of care, pulse oximetry plus transcutaneous carbon-dioxide measurement is a less invasive, alternative method of obtaining similar information.

An ABG test can also measure the level of bicarbonate in the blood.  Many blood-gas analyzers will also report concentrations of lactate, hemoglobin, several electrolytes, oxyhemoglobin, carboxyhemoglobin, and methemoglobin. ABG testing is mainly used in pulmonology and critical-care medicine to determine gas exchange across the alveolar-capillary membrane.  ABG testing also has a variety of applications in other areas of medicine. Combinations of disorders can be complex and difficult to interpret, so calculators, nomograms, and rules of thumb are commonly used.

ABG samples originally were sent from the clinic to the medical laboratory for analysis. Newer equipment lets the analysis be done also as point-of-care testing, depending on the equipment available in each clinic.

Sampling and analysis

Arterial blood for blood-gas analysis is usually drawn by a respiratory therapist and sometimes a phlebotomist, a nurse, a paramedic or a doctor. Blood is most commonly drawn from the radial artery because it is easily accessible, can be compressed to control bleeding, and has less risk for vascular occlusion. The selection of which radial artery to draw from is based on the outcome of an Allen's test. The brachial artery (or less often, the femoral artery) is also used, especially during emergency situations or with children. Blood can also be taken from an arterial catheter already placed in one of these arteries.

There are plastic and glass syringes used for blood gas samples.  Most syringes come pre-packaged and contain a small amount of heparin, to prevent coagulation. Other syringes may need to be heparinised, by drawing up a small amount of liquid heparin and squirting it out again to remove air bubbles. Once the sample is obtained, care is taken to eliminate visible gas bubbles, as these bubbles can dissolve into the sample and cause inaccurate results.  The sealed syringe is taken to a blood gas analyzer.  If a plastic blood gas syringe is used, the sample should be transported and kept at room temperature and analyzed within 30 min.  If prolonged time delays are expected (i.e., greater than 30 min) prior to analysis, the sample should be drawn in a glass syringe and immediately placed on ice.  Standard blood tests can also be performed on arterial blood, such as measuring glucose, lactate, hemoglobins, dyshemoglobins, bilirubin and  electrolytes.

Derived parameters include bicarbonate concentration, SaO2, and base excess.  Bicarbonate concentration is calculated from the measured pH and PCO2 using the Henderson-Hasselbalch equation.  SaO2 is derived from the measured PO2 and calculated based on the assumption that all measured hemoglobin is normal (oxy- or deoxy-) hemoglobin.

Calculations

The machine used for analysis aspirates this blood from the syringe and measures the pH and the partial pressures of oxygen and carbon dioxide. The bicarbonate concentration is also calculated. These results are usually available for interpretation within five minutes.

Two methods have been used in medicine in the management of blood gases  of patients in hypothermia: pH-stat method and alpha-stat method. Recent studies suggest that the α-stat method is superior.
 pH-stat: The pH and other ABG results are measured at the patient's actual temperature. The goal is to maintain a pH of 7.40 and the arterial carbon dioxide tension (paCO2) at 5.3 kPa (40 mmHg) at the actual patient temperature. It is necessary to add CO2 to the oxygenator to accomplish this goal.
 α-stat (alpha-stat): The pH and other ABG results are measured at 37 °C, despite the patient's actual temperature. The goal is to maintain the arterial carbon dioxide tension at 5.3 kPa (40mmHg) and the pH at 7.40 when measured at +37 °C.

Both the pH-stat and alpha-stat strategies have theoretical disadvantages. α-stat method is the method of choice for optimal myocardial function. The pH-stat method may result in loss of autoregulation in the brain (coupling of the cerebral blood flow with the metabolic rate in the brain). By increasing the cerebral blood flow beyond the metabolic requirements, the pH-stat method may lead to cerebral microembolisation and intracranial hypertension.

Guidelines
 A 1 mmHg change in PaCO2 above or below 40 mmHg results in 0.008 unit change in pH in the opposite direction.
 The PaCO2 will decrease by about 1 mmHg for every 1 mEq/L reduction in [] below 24 mEq/L
 A change in [] of 10 mEq/L will result in a change in pH of approximately 0.15 pH units in the same direction.
 Assess relation of pCO2 with pH: If pCO2 & pH are moving in opposite directions i.e., pCO2 ↑ when pH is <7.4 or pCO2 ↓ when pH > 7.4, it is a primary respiratory disorder. If pCO2 & pH are moving in same direction i.e., pCO2 ↑when pH is >7.4 or pCO2 ↓ when pH < 7.4, it is a primary metabolic disorder.

Parameters and reference ranges
These are typical reference ranges, although various analysers and laboratories may employ different ranges.

Contamination of the sample with room air will result in abnormally low carbon dioxide and possibly elevated oxygen levels, and a concurrent elevation in pH.  Delaying analysis (without chilling the sample) may result in inaccurately low oxygen and high carbon dioxide levels as a result of ongoing cellular respiration.

pH

The normal range for pH is 7.35–7.45. As the pH decreases (< 7.35), it implies acidosis, while if the pH increases (> 7.45) it implies alkalosis. In the context of arterial blood gases, the most common occurrence will be that of respiratory acidosis.  Carbon dioxide is dissolved in the blood as carbonic acid, a weak acid; however, in large concentrations, it can affect the pH drastically. Whenever there is poor pulmonary ventilation, the carbon dioxide levels in the blood are expected to rise. This leads to a rise of carbonic acid, leading to a decrease in pH. The first buffer of pH will be the plasma proteins, since these can accept some H+ ions to try to maintain acid-base homeostasis. As carbon dioxide concentrations continue to increase (PaCO2 > 45 mmHg), a condition known as respiratory acidosis occurs. The body tries to maintain homeostasis by increasing the respiratory rate, a condition known as tachypnea. This allows much more carbon dioxide to escape the body through the lungs, thus increasing the pH by having less carbonic acid. If a person is in a critical setting and intubated, one must increase the number of breaths mechanically.

Respiratory alkalosis (Pa CO2 < 35 mmHg) occurs when there is too little carbon dioxide in the blood. This may be due to hyperventilation or else excessive breaths given via a mechanical ventilator in a critical care setting. The action to be taken is to calm the person and try to reduce the number of breaths being taken to normalize the pH. The respiratory pathway tries to compensate for the change in pH in a matter of 2–4 hours. If this is not enough, the metabolic pathway takes place.

Under normal conditions, the Henderson–Hasselbalch equation will give the blood pH

where:
 6.1 is the acid dissociation constant (pKa) of carbonic acid at normal body temperature
 [] is the concentration of bicarbonate in the blood in mEq/L
 PaCO2 is the partial pressure of carbon dioxide in the arterial blood in mmHg

The kidney and the liver are two main organs responsible for the metabolic homeostasis of pH. Bicarbonate is a base that helps to accept excess hydrogen ions whenever there is acidaemia. However, this mechanism is slower than the respiratory pathway and may take from a few hours to 3 days to take effect. In acidaemia, the bicarbonate levels rise, so that they can neutralize the excess acid, while the contrary happens when there is alkalaemia. Thus when an arterial blood gas test reveals, for example, an elevated bicarbonate, the problem has been present for a couple of days, and metabolic compensation took place over a blood acidaemia problem.

In general, it is much easier to correct acute pH derangement by adjusting respiration. Metabolic compensations take place at a much later stage. However, in a critical setting, a person with a normal pH, a high CO2, and a high bicarbonate means that, although there is a high carbon dioxide level, there is metabolic compensation. As a result, one must be careful as to not artificially adjust breaths to lower the carbon dioxide. In such case, lowering the carbon dioxide abruptly means that the bicarbonate will be in excess and will cause a metabolic alkalosis. In such a case, carbon dioxide levels should be slowly diminished.

See also
 Anion gap
 Radial artery puncture
 Chemical equilibrium
 Hemoximetry
 Arteriovenous oxygen difference

References

External links

 Online arterial blood gas calculator

Blood tests
Diagnostic emergency medicine
Diagnostic intensive care medicine
Respiratory physiology
Respiratory therapy